The Brașov railway station is the main station in Brașov, Romania. The building on the current location was opened to traffic in 1962. The station's bell chimes preceding the announcements represent a few notes from Ciprian Porumbescu's operetta Crai Nou.

Services

The station is located at the confluence of several main lines in Romania. In 2008, the Brașov railway station served about 140 passenger trains to a majority of Romanian cities. Regio Trans stock runs from Brașov station to Făgăraș, Întorsura Buzăului, as well as to Zărnești, along with state-operated trains from Căile Ferate Române.

The international trains run to Budapest (Hungary) and to Vienna (Austria);  formerly they also connected with Prague (Czech Republic), Bratislava (Slovakia), and Kraków (Poland). The railway station is served by bus lines and also by two trolleybus lines, operated by RAT Brașov. Prior to 2007, the station was served by a tram line. In 2007 the tram line was replaced by a trolleybus line.

Main lines
Line 200: Brașov – Sibiu – Vințu de Jos – Deva – Curtici
Line 300: Bucharest – Ploiești – Brașov – Sighișoara – Teiuș – Cluj-Napoca – Oradea – Episcopia Bihor
Line 400: Brașov – Sfântu Gheorghe – Miercurea Ciuc – Deda – Dej – Baia Mare – Satu Mare

Distance from other railway stations

Romania
Bucharest: 166 km
Arad: 453 km
Cluj-Napoca: 331 km
Constanța (via București Nord): 391 km
Craiova: 335 km
Galați: 310 km
Iași: 470 km
Oradea: 484 km
Satu Mare (via Cluj Napoca, Baia Mare): 583 km
Suceava (Burdujeni): 457 km
Timișoara: 456 km

Europe
Belgrade: 634 km
Berlin: 1,733 km
Budapest: 706 km
Chișinău: 584 km
Frankfurt am Main: 1,733 km
Kiev: 1,241 km
Sofia: 705 km
Venice: 1,557 km
Vienna: 978 km

External links
Trains timetable

Buildings and structures in Brașov
Railway stations in Romania
Railway stations opened in 1873
Railway stations opened in 1962